Peter or Pete Holmes may refer to:
 Peter Holmes (1675–1732), Irish High Sheriff and MP in the Irish House of Commons
 Peter Holmes (1731–1802), Irish High Sheriff and MP in the Parliament of Ireland
 Peter Holmes (businessman) (1932–2002), British businessman
 Pete Holmes (politician) (born 1956), Seattle City Attorney
 Pete Holmes (born 1979), American stand-up comedian, actor, writer, podcaster, and cartoonist
 Peter Holmes (footballer) (born 1980), English footballer